San Pelayo can refer to:

 Pelagius of Córdoba, tenth-century Christian martyr
 San Pelayo, Colombia, municipality in Colombia
 San Pelayo, Valladolid, municipality in Province of Valladolid, Spain;
 San Pelayo de Guareña, municipality in Province of Salamanca, Spain;